Puru is a village in Jõhvi Parish, Ida-Viru County in northeastern Estonia.

Jõhvi Airfield (ICAO: EEJI) is located on the territories of Puru village.

Pedagogic scientist, school director and politician Peeter Põld (1878–1930) was born in Puru.

References

Villages in Ida-Viru County
Kreis Wierland